Garra platycephala is a species of cyprinid fish in the genus Garra which is found in India.

References 

Garra
Fish described in 1920